The 1984–85 Iowa Hawkeyes men's basketball team represented the University of Iowa as members of the Big Ten Conference. The team was led by second-year head coach George Raveling and played their home games at Carver-Hawkeye Arena in Iowa City, Iowa. They finished the season 21–11, 10–8 in Big Ten play to finish in a tie for fifth place. The Hawkeyes received an at-large bid to the NCAA tournament as the No. 8 seed in the West Region, losing in the First Round to Arkansas.

Previous season 
The Hawkeyes finished the 1983–84 season 13–15 and 6–12 in Big Ten play to finish tied for eighth place.

Roster

Schedule and results

|-
!colspan=9 style=| Non-conference regular season

|-
!colspan=9 style=| Big Ten regular season

|-
!colspan=9 style=| NCAA Tournament

Rankings

Team players in the 1985 NBA Draft

References

Iowa Hawkeyes
Iowa
Iowa Hawkeyes men's basketball seasons
Hawkeyes
Hawkeyes